The Hampshire and Isle of Wight Constabulary is the territorial police force responsible for policing the counties of Hampshire and the Isle of Wight in South East England.

The force area includes Southampton, the largest city in South East England, and the naval city of Portsmouth. It also covers the New Forest National Park, sections of the South Downs National Park, large towns such as Basingstoke, Eastleigh, Andover, Fareham and Aldershot, and the historic city of Winchester. The constabulary, as it is currently constituted, dates from 1967, but modern policing in Hampshire can be traced back to 1832.

In late 2015, the force moved its strategic headquarters to Eastleigh, into a building now shared with Hampshire & Isle of Wight Fire and Rescue Service. At the same time, the force moved its Operational Headquarters to Mottisfont Court in Winchester. The Support & Training Headquarters and control room are located in Netley, near Southampton, in buildings of the former Netley Hospital.

History 
The first fully constituted police force formed in Hampshire was the Winchester City Police, founded in 1832. The Hampshire County Constabulary was established seven years later in December 1839 as a result of the passing of the County Police Act that year. Initially the force had a chief constable and two superintendents: one was based in Winchester, and the second based on the Isle of Wight (then part of Hampshire). The first separate police force on the island was formed in 1837 when the Newport Borough Police was established. A separate Isle of Wight Constabulary was not formed until 1890 when the island was the granted administrative county status.

During the 19th century, Hampshire County Constabulary absorbed various borough forces including Basingstoke Borough Police (1836–1889), Romsey Borough Police (1836–1865), Lymington Borough Police (1836–1852) and Andover Borough Police (1836–1846). The Isle of Wight Constabulary likewise absorbed the borough forces of Newport and Ryde. Winchester, Southampton and Portsmouth continued to have independent police forces. In 1914 the Special Constabulary started to perform regular duties 'for the continuous preservation of order during the war'. Prior to this Special Constables were only called up to assist at major events and riots.

In 1943, as part of the Defence (Amalgamation of Police Forces) Regulations 1942, Hampshire County Constabulary was amalgamated with the Isle of Wight and Winchester City Police forces to form the Hampshire Joint Police Force. The two city forces, Southampton City Police and Portsmouth City Police, remained independent. Although this arrangement was originally intended only as a wartime measure, it continued after hostilities ended. In 1948, the merger was made permanent, with Hampshire Joint Police Force being renamed Hampshire Constabulary.

The name was changed once again in 1957, to Hampshire and Isle of Wight Constabulary. The Police Act 1964 led to the amalgamation of the city forces (Southampton and Portsmouth) into the Hampshire force. This created the present-day Hampshire Constabulary. The last major changes to the police area were in 1974, when the Local Government Act changed a number of local government areas, and the responsibility for policing Christchurch was transferred to Dorset Police.

In November 2022, the force was renamed Hampshire & Isle of Wight Constabulary by Police and Crime Commissioner Donna Jones.

The names of forces that have policed the counties of Hampshire and the Isle of Wight since the nineteenth century are illustrated below:

In 1965, the force had an establishment of 1,346 and an actual strength of 1,137.

The headquarters moved to their current locations in Eastleigh (Strategic HQ) and Winchester (Operational HQ) in 2015. The previous facility in Winchester, close to Winchester Prison sat on the site of the first county headquarters, built in 1847.

Between 2013 and 2017, a number of police stations were closed and sold, while others had their public facilities closed. The need to reduce costs also led to the formation of a Joint Operations Unit with Thames Valley Police which, during the course of 2012, saw the amalgamation of Roads Policing Units, Training, Firearms and Dog Units of the two forces. The IT departments of the forces merged in early 2011. In April 2015, Hampshire Constabulary announced a "new-look policing model", beginning a major reorganisation.

Significant events
1893  Chief Constable Peregrine Fellowes, a former Assistant Adjutant General of Australia, who had been in office for less than two years, is fatally injured in Romsey Road, Winchester  outside police headquarters  when, together with other officers, he attempts to stop a runaway horse and trap. Crushed against a wall he dies several days later from his injuries and is later buried in the Fellowes family plot at Westhill Cemetery, Winchester. 
1914  In Andover, the imprisonment of a mother and daughter sparks rioting involving crowds of up to two thousand people. Local officers seek the assistance of the fire brigade who are pelted with stones and retreat to their station. The arrival of mounted officers from Basingstoke fails to quell the disturbances and only after three days do extra officers drafted in from other stations bring the disorder to an end.
1915  Southampton Police appoint two women police- they were not attested but served in uniform. Miss Annette Tate was one of them
1929  Hampshire Constabulary acquires its first motorised patrol vehicle  a BSA motorcycle combination.
1943  Winchester City Police and Isle of Wight Constabulary forced to amalgamate with Hampshire as a war time measure. The amalgamation became permanent in 1947.
1944  Women Inspector appointed: Miss P Yates.
1957  On 1 April, the name of the force changed from Hampshire Constabulary to Hampshire and Isle of Wight Constabulary
1970  The Isle of Wight Festival takes place at Afton Down attracting huge crowds, estimates varying from five to six hundred thousand, who witness what would be the last UK performance by Jimi Hendrix  he is to die less than three weeks later. Despite the great numbers of people the atmosphere is relaxed and with only 500 officers to police the event the Chief Constable, Sir Douglas Osmond, dons casual clothes and sits with the crowds. He reports to the subsequent public enquiry that the press seem unhappy that it had been so peaceful.
1972  A car bomb, containing approximately 130 kg of explosive, detonates outside the officer's mess at the 16th Parachute Brigade Headquarters in Aldershot. Seven civilians die and nineteen others are seriously injured. The Official Irish Republican Army claim responsibility for the blast the following day. A major criminal enquiry, led personally by Det. Ch. Supt. Cyril Holdaway, then head of the force's CID, succeeds in identifying the bombers and the three are sentenced at Winchester Crown Court later the same year.
1982  Havant Policing Scheme, pioneered by then Chief Constable John Duke, emphasizes the need for linking communication technology with beat officers.
1985  The force aircraft, an Optica, crashes on the outskirts of Ringwood killing the crew  PC Gerry Spencer (pilot) and DC Malcolm Wiltshire (observer).
1987  Introduction of tape recording of interviews with suspects to replace hand written interview notes. One of the first forces in the country to introduce tape recorded interviews. Rolled out across Hampshire over a year.
1988  Introduction of new hand held PFX radio system with four control centres. Hampshire became the first force to leave the Home Office radio communications scheme.
2006  On 15 May, Hampshire Constabulary launches the new single, non-emergency telephone number (SNEN), 101, as an alternative to 999. It is intended for reporting less serious or anti-social offences.
2011  On 22 May, the force seeks assistance from Marwell Wildlife Park, near Winchester when it receives reports of the sighting of what is believed to be a white tiger seen in undergrowth in the Hedge End area of Southampton. The tiger turns out to be a life-size cuddly toy.
2014  Hampshire Constabulary in international news after obtaining a European arrest warrant leading to the arrest in Spain of the parents of Ashya King (who had removed their seriously ill son from a Southampton hospital in order to get treatment abroad).
2017  In September, the constabulary sent officers to the British Virgin Islands to help maintain law and order and assist with relief efforts following the devastation caused by Hurricane Irma.
2021  In January, the Constabulary dismissed five officers after secret recordings were made of racism and sexism in a Crime Unit at Basingstoke.
2021  In February, the Constabulary dismissed Chief Specials Officer Tom Haye for Gross Misconduct after he had used the term pikey in a private message to a 'friend'.

Chief constables
18391842: Captain George Robbins
18421856: Captain William C. Harris
18561891: Captain John Henry Forrest
18911893: Captain Peregrine Henry Thomas Fellowes (killed on duty)
18941928: Major St Andrew Bruce Warde
19281942: Major Ernest Radcliffe Cockburn
19421962: Sir Richard Dawnay Lemon 
19621977: Sir Douglas Osmond 
19771988: Sir John Duke
19881999: Sir John Hoddinott 
19992008: Paul Kernaghan 
20082013: Alex Marshall 
20132016: Andy Marsh
20162023: Olivia Pinkney
2023present: Scott Chilton</ref>

Structure

Chief officers 
, the force has the following chief officers:
Chief constable: Scott Chilton
Deputy chief constable: Ben Snuggs
Assistant chief constable (corporate services): Lucy Hutson
Assistant chief constable (local policing and public protection): Paul Bartolomeo [temporary]
Assistant chief constable (joint services): Catherine Akehurst
Assistant chief constable (crime, criminal justice and intelligence): Robert France

Police and crime commissioner 
The force is overseen by an elected police and crime commissioner (PCC) on non-operational matters (i.e. budget and priorities). The current Hampshire and Isle of Wight PCC is Donna Jones, of the Conservative Party, who was elected in May 2021.

Operational Commands (strands) 
In 2016, Hampshire Constabulary announced a "new-look policing model" which organised its resources into four functional command sections (known internally as strands), each commanded by a chief superintendent. It also merged the six local policing divisions known as Operational Command Units (OCUs) into three Policing divisions known as the Northern, Eastern and Western areas.

This reorganisation fundamentally changed how the force operated at all levels which lead to it introducing a "borderless" model for response teams, rather than it being operationally confined to smaller districts as it was in the days of Operational Command Units (OCUs). The aim is to make sure that the nearest police unit is always sent to an incident.

The core policing activities are organised into four Operational Command sections: Intelligence, Tasking and Development, Prevention and Neighbourhoods, Response and Patrol and Investigations. There is also another section of specialised officers called the Joint Operations Unit, which is a joint unit with Thames Valley Police.

Intelligence, Tasking and Development 
This strand has units for handling intelligence, forecasting demand and monitoring police performance.

Prevention and Neighbourhoods 
This strand focuses on preventative and community policing. It is organised based on local government, with each local authority area having a "local commander", sometimes shared. These are superintendents for the three unitary authorities (Southampton, Portsmouth and Isle of Wight) and chief inspectors for the non-metropolitan districts of Hampshire. The Neighbourhood policing teams (NPTs) are aligned with council wards. It also includes safeguarding units, partnership units and police initiatives such as Hampshire Horsewatch and Countrywatch.

Hampshire Horsewatch
In an effort to maintain equine-oriented crime at low levels, the force supports a Horsewatch programme (started 1992) to raise awareness of crime, including the theft of animals, equipment and vehicles. The force's Equine Liaison Officers who liaise with the equine community perform their duties voluntarily.

Countrywatch
CountryWatch is continuing programme of policing operations with the objective of tackling crime in the rural communitiese such as theft, poaching, fly-tipping and the use of nuisance vehicles. The programme promotes reassurance and communication, particularly between rural and neighbourhood officers. ACC Laura Nicholson is the national ACPO-lead, for CountryWatch.

Response and Patrol (R&P) 
This strand makes up the majority of police officers on duty at any given time. Their primary roles are to respond to the incoming emergency calls and to proactively patrol to prevent and detect crime. Student officers who have successfully completed their training at the Support & Training Headquarters are stationed at one of the patrol hubs initially before undertaking further training with other commands. This strand is the main user of the centralised, borderless model. Officers start and end their shifts at a patrol hub but are not officially confined to any subdivision of Hampshire while at work. The strand also includes call handlers and control room staff who work very closely with the police officers on the ground.

This section is filled mostly with skilled and experienced police officers who become highly trained police vehicle response drivers (as not all police officers are trained or allowed to drive with lights and sirens activated). They also make up the largest number of Taser carriers in the force who often deal more serious incidents usually involving weapons that are not firearms or an unacceptable level of risk that requires a justifiable use of force.

Investigations 
This strand consists of the criminal investigation department and custody staff. The investigation strand is more centralised than before the reorganisation; with its detectives, other officers and police staff investigators (PSIs) being based at the four police stations with regularly-used custody suites:
Northern Police Investigation Centre in Basingstoke
Southampton Central Police Station
Eastern Police Investigation Centre in Portsmouth
Newport Police Station on the Isle of Wight.

Within each PIC you will find specialist departments. These include rape investigation teams, child abuse units and major crime teams alongside the Investigation department (formerly CID).

This strand also contains special units that are set up to combat particular crime areas such as cyber crime or drug related violence (Operation Fortress).

Joint Operations Unit (JOU) 
This section consists of the units that are shared with Thames Valley Police. These include the road policing units, training sections, firearms units and dog units of the two forces. The Joint Operations Unit is overseen by an assistant chief constable, who is a joint employee of both forces.

Roads Policing Unit (RPU) 
The Roads Policing Unit patrol motorways and trunk roads across the two forces' areas. In Hampshire this is made up of large sections of the M3, all of the M27, the M271 and the M275 together with parts of the A3, A27, A31, A34 and A303.

In addition to providing an emergency response to incidents on the road its work is directed towards reducing casualties and offending and in particular at disrupting the activities of travelling criminals.

The unit operates from three bases in Hampshire: Havant (near the M27 and M275), Totton (near the M271 and M27) and Whitchurch (near the M3 & A34).

As part of the programme of sharing resources (and thereby reducing costs) agreed between the two forces in late 2010, Hampshire's Roads Policing Unit commenced joint operations with Thames Valley Police's RPU in January 2012. The combined unit is overseen by the Joint Operations Unit.

Dog Support Unit (DSU)
Hampshire Constabulary acquired its first two dogs in 1959. The force now has a variety of dogs in use across the two counties, working 24-hours a day. The unit, based at the support headquarters at Netley, near Southampton. Dogs are trained in a variety of skills including passive drug searching, searches for firearms, explosives, ammunition, and currency. The dogs are also trained to locate people in a variety of situations. For example, they are able to find people who are trapped in collapsed buildings.

Armed response vehicles and Tactical Firearms Support Units
Hampshire's firearms units provides suitably trained and equipped officers to respond to incidents involving the criminal use of firearms through its armed response vehicles (ARV) and tactical teams. The force has many ARVs (With both Police liveried and unmarked variants - a marked ARV is distinguishable from other police vehicles as it has big and bright coloured asterisk [*] stickers that are displayed on all four corners of the vehicle) and they usually contain two or three police officers that are specially trained authorised firearms officers (AFO). Many tactical options are available to the ARVs as they contain (either upon the AFOs or inside the ARV itself) shields, advanced lifesaving equipment and their firearms which include pistols, carbines incendiary devices and less than lethal options such as Tasers, baton and baton gun. The units have a permanent staff of instructors, administrators and the Force Armourer, who is responsible for the safe storage, maintenance and record keeping for each of the force's firearms.

Marine Unit

In addition, the unit is responsible for the investigation of marine incidents and supporting the work of the UK Border Agency, HM Coastguard and the harbour authorities.
The unit comprises a sergeant and six constables and has two tactical rigid inflatables, one semi-displacement patrol launch and various land-based patrol vehicles. The ribs and launches are:
Police Launch Commander, a  catamaran
Police RIB Protector, a  tactical RIB

Mutual Aid Support Team
The Mutual Aid Support Team (MAST), consists of police officers that have taken on further training to deal with less routine incidents such as large scale or more violent public disorder or policing events where it is likely to occur. In other forces MAST is sometimes known as the Territorial Support Group or L2.

Other support units
There are many units that support the above Operational units, which include: the Planning and Policy Unit, The Critical Incident Cadre (which is designed to provide tactical support in the event of any major incident within the force area), the Scientific Services unit (which consists of the Crime Scene Investigators), Special Branch and both the Serious Organised Crime and Major Crime units.

Uniform, equipment and vehicles

Headgear 

Male constables and sergeants of Hampshire Constabulary wear the traditional comb-style custodian helmet when on foot patrol. However, Hampshire is one of only three other UK forces that does not use the common Brunswick star style force badge, favouring instead a large metal plate that mirrors the county crest, depicting a laurel wreath enclosing a crowned rose above a banner that reads 'Hampshire'.

The helmets worn by constables have larger helmet plates of uncoloured white metal whilst those worn by sergeants have slightly smaller helmet plates that includes blue and red enamelled detail on the crown, rose and county title. The helmet plate worn by constables is the largest of all those worn by forces in England and Wales and ensures that they stand out in the company of officers from other areas.

Officers wear a peaked cap with black and white chequered hat band when on mobile patrol in vehicles whilst Roads Policing Unit (RPU) officers wear a similar cap with a white top. Female officers wear a bowler hat (with black and white chequered hat band), or a similar bowler hat for female RPU officers but with a white top. PCSO's wear peaked caps with a blue hat band. Each of these caps have smaller versions of the helmet plate.

Officers holding the rank of Police Inspector or above wear peaked caps.

Uniform 
When on duty, Frontline Police Officers wear a black, wicking T-shirt with the word 'Police' on the sleeves, and black uniform trousers. Hampshire officers no longer use the traditional police jumper, having favoured a black fleece with 'Police' written on the chest and back. Hampshire officers do not have Brunswick stars on their epaulettes, just the rank insignia if a Police Inspector or above, rank insignia and collar number for a Police Sergeant and just a collar number for a Police Constable. The Special Constabulary adopt the same standards as their regular counterparts, and in 2019 changed their rank insignia to match their regular counterparts. PCSOs wear a similar uniform, however instead of a black, wicking shirt they wear blue wicking shirts.

Formal dress comprises an open-necked tunic, with white shirt and black tie for both male and female officers. Constables and Sergeants wear custodian helmet's and collar numbers on their epaulettes, officers above these ranks wear peaked caps, name badges and their rank on their epaulettes. The No.1 uniform is accompanied by black boots or shoes and occasionally black gloves, or brown gloves for the rank of Inspector and above. Special Constables recently wore white gloves with their tunics at the 175 Special Constabulary anniversary celebration, held at Winchester cathedral.

Hampshire Constabulary also list leggings as part an optional piece of uniform.

Personal equipment 
Hampshire Constabulary officers are required to wear a stab vest whilst on patrol. Hampshire officers generally wear black stab vests, although some officers wear fluorescent yellow stab vests for activities such as cycling. In addition, officers carry TETRA digital radios, Body Worn Video, rigid handcuffs, incapacitant spray, the ASP 21" collapsible baton, leg restraints, a resuscitation mask and a basic first aid kit. PCSO's do not carry ASPs, handcuffs, leg restraints or incapacitant spray.

Police vehicles may contain a variety of equipment, which can include traffic cones, road signs, breathalyzers, HOSTYD, speed guns, defibrillator, advanced first aid kit and the like.

Vehicles and livery 
Hampshire Constabulary uses a wide selection of vehicles for their individual capabilities and the requirements of the roles for which they
are employed.

Historically, the force had used a distinctive vehicle paint scheme of retro-reflective red and white diagonal stripes above a retro-reflective chequered blue and white band. Since 2005, the standard yellow and blue retro-reflective battenberg markings, together with the force crest on the bonnet, on all marked, operational vehicles.

Aircraft
Aviation support is provided by the National Police Air Service established in 2012. Hampshire Constabulary had established an Air Support Unit in 1989 operating a fixed wing Britten-Norman BN-2 Islander from a former Royal Naval Air Station at Lee-on-the-Solent. In March 2001, the Islander was replaced by a Britten-Norman Defender 4000. In 2010, the Air Support Unit was disbanded following a decision to establish a joint South East Air Support Unit with Sussex Police and Surrey Police operating two helicopters.

Strength and recruitment 
As of March 2017, Hampshire Constabulary has 2,896 police officers, 364 special constables, 304 designated officers, 385 police community support officers and 1,421 police staff. By comparison, in 2010, the force had 3,748 police officers, 337 PCSOs and 2,424 police staff. The force has reduced its workforce by 23% since 2010, compared to the national average of 15%.  This has led to some criticism from various sources around central government funding for the force.

Training for new recruits in Hampshire is conducted at the Support and Training Headquarters at Netley. For constables it consists of 15 weeks intensive training and a two-year probationary period that contains further structured training. For PCSOs it consists of six weeks training and a one-year probationary period. For special constables it consists of seven months of training during weeknights and weekends, and a two-year probationary period or less, dependent on the number of tours of duty.

Performance

Her Majesty's Inspectorate of Constabulary 
Previous results of inspections by Her Majesty's Inspectorate of Constabulary (HMIC) are published below:

In November 2014, a HMIC report on crime recording found Hampshire Constabulary failed to record, as crime, 40% of incidents, one of the three worst force performances in the country. A subsequent inspection by HMIC in 2018, showed that the overall crime recording rate had significantly increased to 91.3% of reported crimes being recorded as such.

Independent Office for Police Conduct 
The Professional Standards department of the force investigate the majority of complaints made against police. However, details of complaints received are notified to the Independent Office for Police Conduct (IOPC) which is a non-departmental public body responsible for overseeing the system for handling complaints made against police forces throughout England and Wales. The IOPC may choose to manage or supervise investigations conducted into complaints and may conduct the investigations themselves in the most serious cases. The IOPC sets the standards of the investigation of complaints against police and also acts as the appeals body in cases where members of the public are dissatisfied with the way in which a police force has handled their complaint.

In the period April 2011 to December 2011, complaints and allegations made against officers of Hampshire Constabulary had decreased from the previous year (previous years figures in brackets). Hampshire's overall complaints rate of 181 (206) per 1,000 employees is slightly above the national average of 172 (159) per 1,000 employees. 
In that period Hampshire were above national average for complaints concerning 'Neglect or Failure in duty' and 'Oppressive Conduct or Harassment'. Of all complaints received during the period 0% (1%) were discontinued - national average 1% - some 5% (3%) were dispensed - national average 7% - and 6% (5%) were withdrawn - national average 10%). Of the total, 13% (11%) of complaints were found to have 'substantiated finding', 3% lower than the national average.

Stonewall Workplace Equality Index
The Stonewall Workplace Equality Index is an annual index of UK employers completed by the LGBT (Lesbian Gay Bisexual Transgender) rights charity Stonewall. Through their submissions to Stonewall, Hampshire Constabulary were consistently high performers on the index from 2006 to 2013, scoring no lower than 15th place overall. In 2009 and 2010 the Constabulary were 2nd place in Top Employer category. In 2017 the Constabulary were still in the top 100 at 65th (Leicestershire was the top police employer).

In popular culture 
The crime fiction writer Graham Hurley draws on his knowledge of Hampshire Constabulary, and in particular Portsmouth CID, for his series of police procedural novels. Set in Portsmouth and revolving around the fictional Detective Inspector Joe Faraday they portray a gritty picture of the city and its crime.

Ruth Rendell's series of crime novels are set in the fictional town of Kingsmarkham. In the books the town is described as being in Sussex, however when the books were televised, Romsey was chosen as the setting for the location filming. Inspector Wexford is often seen wearing a Hampshire Constabulary tie and warrant card badge. Hampshire Constabulary authorised the use of the force logo and have provided props and material for the series.

A retired Hampshire detective anonymously published Welcome to the Farce; in 2018, recounting his service in the years leading up to his retirement. He used the pen name Detective Miggins and called the Constabulary 'Bullshire'.

Hampshire Constabulary has featured in various series of Traffic Cops, an occasional BBC One documentary. The programme focuses on the work of Hampshire's Roads Policing officers and highlights issues relating to road safety and reducing the number of road deaths and serious injuries.

The day-to-day work of Hampshire Constabulary featured in some 69 episodes, spanning three series, of the popular BBC 1 observational documentary, Real Rescues. This series first aired on BBC 1 in October 2007

The three-part, Channel 4 documentary, The Force followed the work of Hampshire detectives during the investigation of three serious crimes in the county. The first episode followed the progress of an enquiry into the murder of a woman whose body had been found in a field near Basingstoke whilst the second revealed the work of Hampshire's dedicated rape unit during a live investigation in Portsmouth. The last programme featured a re-investigation of the arson of a block of flats in Portsmouth as a result of which a young man died.

Controversies

Social media arrest 
In July 2022, the force was criticised when officers arrested a man for tweeting an image of a swastika, composed of four progress flags. Campaigner Harry Miller was arrested at the same time.  The force's own police and crime commissioner publicly questioned the proportionality and necessity of the arrest.  One week later, it was announced that the Force was scrapping its hate-crime awareness courses.

See also 

Law enforcement in the United Kingdom
List of law enforcement agencies in the United Kingdom, Crown Dependencies and British Overseas Territories

Sources 
Dixon, B. (2006). A very special force: 175th Anniversary of Hampshire Special Constabulary. Hampshire Constabulary publication.
Lee, J., Peake, C.,Stevens, D and Williams, C (2001). Policing Hampshire and the Isle of Wight. Chichester, Phillimore. 
Miggins, Detective (2018). Welcome to the Farce. Leicestershire, Matador. 
Syms, Diana (2019). Policing Petersfield 1840-2016. Petersfield Museum. 
Watt, I. A. (1967). A history of the Hampshire & Isle of Wight Constabulary 1839–1966. Winchester, Hampshire & Isle of Wight Constabulary.
Williams, C (2012) 111 years policing Winchester Hampshire Constabulary History Society . 
Williams, C (2016) Women policing Hampshire and the Isle of Wight 1915-2016 Hampshire Constabulary History Society.

References

External links 

 
 Hampshire Constabulary at Her Majesty's Inspectorate of Constabulary and Fire & Rescue Services
 Hampshire Constabulary History Society website

Organisations based in Hampshire
Police forces of England
Government agencies established in 1839
1839 establishments in England